Mut Wind Farm is a wind power plant consisting of eleven wind turbines situated on Mt. Magras in Özlü in the Mut district of Mersin Province in southern Turkey. The wind farm went into service in 2010.

Geography 
The farm is constructed on Mount Magras, a part of Toros Mountains range to the north of Mut district in Mersin Province. Mount Magras is actually the top of a  canyon to the south of Göksu River valley and the town of Göksu. The wind turbines are erected just to the northeast of the village Özlü and the farm is sometimes called the Özlü Wind Farm.

Technical details 
Maximum power output of each turbine is 3 MW and the total annual energy production is about 100 MWh.

Project 
The US$50 million project was carried out by Ağaoğlu Energy Group, and it is further planned to increase the number of turbines to 40.

See also

 Dağpazarı Wind Farm

References 

Mut District
Wind farms in Turkey
Energy infrastructure completed in 2010
2010 establishments in Turkey